Le Progrès is a regional daily newspaper which is based in Lyon, Rhône.

Le Progrès reports primarily on local news in the Rhône-Alpes region. The paper has its headquarters in Lyon. The print works is in Chassieu, near Lyon. The former headquarters was located in the Rue de la République, in the building that is currently occupied by Fnac. René Diaz worked there as a journalist and illustrator for 30 years.

The 1998 circulation of the paper was 262,000 copies; by 2020, it was 151,811 copies.

References

External links

Daily newspapers published in France
Mass media in Lyon
Newspapers established in 1859
1859 establishments in France